Kill the Headlights is the fourth studio album by Adema, released on August 21, 2007.

The album is the only to feature vocalist Bobby Reeves, and guitarist Ed Faris, from the Los Angeles nu metal band LeVeL.

The album was released by Immortal Records, after 2005's Planets was released by Earache Records. The album is the band's first not to debut on the Billboard 200 charts. It registered first weeks sales of approximately 2,000 copies.

Track listing

Other songs recorded
 "Human Nature"
 "Somethin' Better" (Elements of it would later be used in "Waiting for Daylight")
 "Out Alive"
 "Los Angeles" (Demo)
 "Human Nature" (Team Cybergeist Version)

Personnel

Adema
 Bobby Reeves – lead vocals
 Tim Fluckey – lead guitar, backing vocals
 Ed Faris – rhythm guitar, keyboards, synthesizers, programming
 Dave DeRoo – bass guitar, backing vocals
 Kris Kohls – drums, percussion

Production
 Produced & Arranged by Marshall Altman
 Mixed by Eric Robinson & Marshall Altman
 Recorded by Marshall Altman, Ryan Williams, & Ed Faris
 Recorded at:
 The Galt Line Studios – Burbank, CA
 Assistant: Marcus Samperio
 Ed Faris Studio 8
 Mastered by Eddy Schreyer at Oasis Mastering
 A&R: Jamie Talbot
 Management: Kevin Lee for Union Entertainment Group, Inc.
 Legal: Bryan Christner
 Business Management: Laurand Management/ Henry Schiffer, CPA
 Publicity: Alex Ross for Supreme Entertainment
 Photography: Alex Solca
 Sales: Yuri Dutton
 New Media: Jay Fisher
 Artwork: I. Rentz

References

2007 albums
Adema albums
Immortal Records albums
Albums produced by Marshall Altman